Ollersett is an area of New Mills, Derbyshire, England, about  northeast of the town centre, between St. George's Road and High Hill Road.

Ollersett Field
It was the location of the 2006 New Mills carnival fair. There are plans for it to be turned into a football pitch for New Mills AFC. To one side of the field runs the Sett Valley Trail.

Ollersett Allotments
Ollersett Allotments are a set of allotments at one end of Ollersett Field owned by New Mills Town Council, and managed by New Mills Allotment and Gardening Society. They are rented out for £25 per year and postcards are available for 25p at New Mills Heritage Centre.

References

Hamlets in Derbyshire
High Peak, Derbyshire